The Church of St. Frances of Rome is a Roman Catholic parish church under the authority of the Roman Catholic Archdiocese of New York, located at 4307 Barnes Avenue Bronx, New York City. The parish was established in 1898.

The architect for the 1967 church was Paul W. Reilly.

Its name honors St. Frances of Rome.

References

External links
 The Catholic Parishes of Wakefield: St Frances of Rome Rectory

Religious organizations established in 1898
Roman Catholic churches in the Bronx